Katie Clarke is an English operatic soprano.

Clarke studied in Vienna at the Akademie für Musik und Darstellende Kunst with Ilse Rapf.

Career 
Clarke was a member of the English National Opera (ENO) from the 1975/76 season, and sang as a guest at the Royal Opera House.

Clarke appeared at the Bayreuth Festival, first in the choir, then from 1976 in all five presentations of the Jahrhundertring, including its DVD recording. She appeared as Helmwige in Die Walküre, and from 1977 to the end also as Third Norn in Götterdämmerung.

In 1976, she also appeared as the First Norn with the ENO at the Opera Scotland. A reviewer noted: " For the rest there is a young newcomer, Katie Clarke, the top of whose voice is ideally powerful and brilliant, though her middle range could gain a little in penetration. But the line is there, and she looks and moves well." In a 1975 recording of an ENO performance in English conducted by Reginald Goodall, she performed as Gerlinde alongside Alberto Remedios as Siegmund, Margaret Curphey as Sieglinde, Rita Hunter as Brünnhilde and Norman Bailey as Wotan.

References

External links 
 

Year of birth missing (living people)
Place of birth missing (living people)
Living people
English operatic sopranos
20th-century British women opera singers